Craig Napier (born 14 November 1965) is a Scottish former football defender.

Napier began his career with Clyde, making over 100 appearances in 4 years before moving to Hamilton Academical. He stayed with the Accies for 6 years, before having relatively short spells at Kilmarnock, Falkirk and Ayr United. He retired in 1996.

External links

Living people
1965 births
Scottish footballers
Clyde F.C. players
Hamilton Academical F.C. players
Kilmarnock F.C. players
Falkirk F.C. players
Ayr United F.C. players
Sportspeople from East Kilbride
Scottish Football League players
Association football defenders
Footballers from South Lanarkshire